The Bruisers originally released the album Cruisin' for a Bruisin' in 1994 on Lost & Found Records. This re-released version came out in 2004 on Taang! Records and is enhanced with six live videos

Track listing
Till the End
Geed
Raise Yer Glass
Borrowed Time
Iron Chin
Trouble
Dead End Boys
2 Fists Full of Nuthin'
American Night
Ollie Vee (Buddy Holly cover)

Enhanced videos
Intimidation 
Bloodshed
American Night
Never Fall
Independence Day

External links
The Bruisers

1994 albums
The Bruisers albums